Merì is a comune (municipality) in the Metropolitan City of Messina in the Italian region Sicily, located about  east of Palermo and about  west of Messina.

Merì borders the following municipalities: Barcellona Pozzo di Gotto, Milazzo, San Filippo del Mela, Santa Lucia del Mela.

References

Cities and towns in Sicily